Ephorus or Ephoros may refer to:

 Ephorus of Cyme (c. 400–330 BC), ancient Greek historian
 Ephorus the Younger (fl. 3rd century AD), of Cyme, ancient Greek historian
 Ephorus (teacher), Ephesian painter and teacher of Apelles
 Ephorus, the title of a bishop in the Batak Christian Protestant Church